Wat Rajabopit School is a Bangkok public school located in the Phra Nakhon District. It was established on March 2, 1886, during the reign of King Chulalongkorn (Rama V.) The name “Rajabopit” means "established by the king."

History 
The school was established by Krom Praya Damrong Rajanubhab as an Art Thai language school near the beginning of Thailand’s educational system. It came during the reign of King Rama V. Prince Monk Arunnipakunakorn, once Somdet Budhacariya, abbot of Wat Rajabopit, made an agreement with the Department of Education. This occurred during the era of Chula Sakarat 1247 corresponding to Rattanakosin Era 104 or B.E. 2428. The name “Wat Rajabopit School” appears in the Royal Thai Government Gazette.

Initially, the Prince allowed the school to use the upper section of the monastery's sermon hall beside Fueang Nakhon Road. The sermon hall was used as a storehouse by the monks.

The school enrolled 53 students and 2 teachers. Mr. Kawee was the school's first principal. The first student to pass Prayok was Pranakharase (Mongkol Amatyakul) in B.E. 2430.

Approximately three years later, B.E. 2431, Mr. Payom became principal. The school’s popularity led to overcrowding. Consequently, the Prince let the school move to the ground floor of his parsonage. (now the location of Puchong Pratan Witthayasith 1 Building). After enrollment grew again, he let the school use three pavilions of the temple around the chapel and church. The school then offered only primary grades 1–4, serving 100 students, and had Luang Chamnan Anusan (Rod Raktaprajitr) as principal.

Emblems

Badge
The school badge of Wat Rajabopit school is Chatra 5 floor (The Royal 5 -Tiered Umbrella). The school letters are R.B. ( ร.บ.) acronym of the words Wat Rajabopit. It indicates that Wat Rajabopit School has continuously been the patron school of the abbot and the temple since its inception.

Motto
The motto of Wat Rajabopit School is วิริเยน ทุกฺขมจฺเจติ which means: 'people who are not suffering because they have perseverance.'

Colors 
There are two colors: white and yellow. White represents purity as a sign of Buddhism since the school was once a temple and is located on its grounds. Yellow represents the color of the monks and symbolizes the grace of the patron. The patron took care of everything and worked to improve the school.

Representative tree
The school tree is the Burma Padauk, also called Pterocarpus macrocarpus, which can be found planted around the school grounds.

Identities of student / Identity of school
Gentlemen Buddhist Way - Study well, Featured Activities, Moral emphasis

References

External links

Boys' schools in Thailand
Schools in Bangkok
Phra Nakhon district
1886 establishments in Siam
 Educational institutions established in 1886